Bufford is a surname. Notable people with the name include:

Charles Lee Bufford (born 1953-4), American man cleared of murder
Jamall Bufford, American rapper known as "Buff1"
John Henry Bufford (1810-1870), American lithographer
Joseph Henry Bufford (c.1854-1923), American state legislator

See also
Buford (surname)
Burford (surname)
Bluford (disambiguation)
Bruford (disambiguation)